"Turning into You" is a song by American punk rock band The Offspring. The song impacted radio on September 11, 2012. It is the fourth track and second single (third overall) from the band's ninth studio album, Days Go By (2012) in the U.S. The song peaked at No. 39 on the Billboard Alternative Songs chart with minor airplay. A music video directed by Bill Fishman was produced for the song, but was later cancelled.

Charts

References

The Offspring songs
Columbia Records singles
2012 songs
2012 singles
Song recordings produced by Bob Rock
Songs written by Dexter Holland